Edward David Penny CNZM FRSNZ (born 1939 in Taumarunui) is a theoretical and evolutionary biologist from New Zealand. He has researched the nature of evolutionary transformations, and is widely published in the fields of phylogenetic tree, genetics and evolutionary biology. Penny's contributions to science have been recognised with several awards and honours, and acceptance into the National Academy of Sciences.

Education and career
Penny attended New Plymouth Boys' High School before gaining undergraduate degrees in botany and chemistry at the University of Canterbury.  He completed his PhD in botany at Yale University in 1965 and later worked as a postdoctoral researcher at McMaster University. He returned to New Zealand in 1966 and joined the staff at Massey University, within the Department of Plant Biology, School of Biological Sciences, Institute for Molecular BioSciences, and Institute of Fundamental Sciences and in 2005 Penny was named a Distinguished Professor. From 2002 to 2010 Penny co-led the Allan Wilson Centre, one of the original New Zealand Centres of Research Excellence hosted at Massey University.  Until it closed in 2015, the centre had a focus on researching the evolution and ecology of New Zealand and Pacific plant and animal life.  After retiring in 2017 he became a Professor Emeritus.

Selected research
His research has focused on theoretical biology, molecular evolution, human evolution, and the history of science..

Early work
In the 1970s Penny looked into how genetic information on all forms of life could be used to investigate questions such as the origin of life, the occurrence of evolution and the relationship between species and communities. He helped to develop "mathematical techniques and computer programmes to analyse DNA sequences and construct evolutionary trees...[developing]... new insights that support the idea that humans evolved in and then migrated from Africa and that the first forms of life were based on the simpler RNA molecule rather than DNA." In 1998 he co-authored a paper providing compelling DNA-based evidence that the Māori migration to New Zealand included between 50 and 100 females, a finding noted by the authors as "entirely consistent with Māori oral history as well as the results of recent canoe voyages recreating early trans-oceanic voyages."

Phylogentic trees
It was said that the paper Construction of Phylogentic Trees (1967) was what first made Penny interested in tracing the process of evolution. One of the authors of that paper, Walter Fitch, reflected in 1988 that the inspiration for their 1967 research was to develop a computer programme that would break the genetic code and develop a "molecular paleontological record in proteins and nucleic acid." Penny's early research challenged the theories of evolution at the time. In looking to clarify a sound basis of classification, in 1982 he entered the controversy  about whether relationships between organisms should be expressed in "evolutionary terms, or on clusters based on overall similarity", and concluded that retaining the original data supported sound classification.

Tree building methods have been explored by research teams in which Penny was involved. In 1985, he collaborated on work that evaluated the reliability of these and the research paper concludes that there needs to be a balance between the traditional approach of "weighting the characters" and a computer-based approach utilizing the growing awareness of numerical taxonomy. Another paper in 1992, while noting at times the conventional methods are reliable, also presents a new approach.  This is known as LogDet and according to the authors of the paper, "allows tree-selection methods to consistently recover the correct tree when sequences evolve under simple asymmetric models...produce sequences of different nucleotide compositions...and are more realistic than most standard models." In 1993 he co-authored a research paper that takes the position there is progress being made with methods for evolutionary trees. In the Abstract, the authors explain the signals of macromolecules from a common history and clarifiy the intention of the  research as being to discuss methods that are "efficient (fast), consistent, powerful, robust, and falsifiable", for inferring evolutionary trees from these patterns or signals. The paper concludes that most methods of tree inference need corrections, but "the recognition that methods may be both efficient and consistent is also useful."

Evolution of eukaryotes
A paper co-authored by Penny in 2006, challenged the prevailing view at the time that eukaryotes had evolved by genome fusion between archaea and bacteria, suggesting they "were more likely to have been reduced by sequence loss and cellular simplification after the possible emergence of a predatory eukaryote.  This research was significant because it suggested that  modern eukaryote and prokaryote cells have long followed separate evolutionary trajectories, confirming "that evolution does not proceed monotonically from the simpler to the more complex." Penny told NBC News the results may been surprising to some, but stressed that there is little evidence of the fusion theory explaining "the special genetic and cellular features of the eukaryotes". He suggested it is an example of evolution being "backwards, sideways and occasionally forward." A group of international scientists did dispute the findings in the 2006 paper. They claimed the writers had "delivered biased opinions" that presented "an introns-early (and eukaryotes-first) view of early evolution that was current in 1980 and that was shown by conventional scientific criteria to be untenable over a decade ago." In the same journal,  Penny et al. responded that new information from cellular and molecular genomics provided previously unavailable information on eukaryote origins. They agreed it is still premature to decide between introns first, early, or late...nevertheless, our primary conclusion is that there is good progress on understanding the complexity of the ancestral eukaryote cell."

Penny was also part of a research team that explored theories for eukaryote origins and noted that some of these ignore life history and ecological principles, and it is necessary to challenge predictions there was a long period in early life with no predators. The authors conclude that their results are "consistent with the expectation that the ability to gain energy via engulfment of other unicells evolved early during evolution...thus from first principles, it is unlikely that there ever was an extended period (1–3 billion years) when there were no predators that lived by engulfing smaller cells." This has implications when considering the most likely time that eukaryotes emerged and challenges the view that these cells arose sometime between 9.85 ~ 2.75 billion years ago. From the starting point that phagocytotic predators were almost exclusively eukaryotic, the paper holds that these existed earlier in evolution.

Bird evolution
After working as a member of a team researching bird evolution in 2008, Penny co-authored the paper of the work which confirmed there are problems in this area for evolutionary biologists.  The writers say it is partly due to scientists being mislead by "convergence of morphology...[and]...problems and phylogenies based on short DNA sequences." The paper further attempts to resolve issues around "the relationships between clades and the timing of the evolution of birds", and based on the phylogenetic data, concludes that "seven Metave species do not share a common evolutionary history within the Neoaves." Resolution of controversies around the understanding of the evolutionary relationship between modern birds due to this polytomy at the base of the Neonaves, is the focus of later research in which Penny participated. New developments suggested in this paper include reducing noise level and more accurate use of formulae to finding predefined groupings in the optimal tree. Significantly the research reports the existence of nine new mitochondrial genomes [which] "support a major diversification of at least 12 neoavian lineages in the Late Cretaceous." Penny has also been involved in 2010 research that suggests some ratites nested and therefore had previously flown.  One example, the extinct moa, closely related to the tinamou breed of birds from South America, according to Penny may have flown or "was blown, to New Zealand via Antarctica before it froze over."

Origin of land plants
A paper co-authored by Penny in 1995, notes that more genomic  data  is needed to "establish and clarify evolutionary relationships...to accurately estimate phylogenetic trees...[for]...the origin of land plants as a prerequisite for understanding  the  transition  from  the  aquatic  to  the  terrestrial habitat  of  plants".  The paper challenges the view that variability between gene trees from different nuclear genes can lead to a conclusion of a 'supergene' tree, and suggests high levels of variability (hererogeniety) of gene trees need to be incorporated in research into the origin of land plants. The conclusion is that research indicates the "coalescent method across different subsets of data  consistently suggested  that  the  ancestors  of  Zygnematales  are  the  closest  relatives of  land  plants." Penny was part of a team that in 2013 that continued investigating the relationship between green algae and the evolution of land plants. A paper on the research, co-authored by Penny, concludes that after analysing a chloroplast genome data set, "Zygnematales alone, or a clade consisting of Coleochaetales plus Zygnematales, [are] the closest living relatives of land plants."

Viruses
In 1989 a team involving Penny used the science of evolutionary trees to analyse sequences from the H1 strand of human viruses and conclude their findings are "in agreement with the biological (evolutionary) model." By 2006 researchers, including Penny, had described the molecular epidemiology of respiratory  syncytial virus (RSV), providing key information to aid RSV vaccine design and the development of novel treatment strategies. The frequency of Hepatitis C virus in the Western Pacific islands was tested in 2013, and the paper, co-authored by Penny, suggests an hypothesise that "genotypes 1 and/or 4 are circulating in South Pacific Island people and that these peoples are genetically predisposed to be more likely to spontaneous resolve HCV infection than to become chronic carriers." However the researchers conclude that "the prevalence and preponderance of HCV makes it a global
health problem and accurate epidemiological data must underpin any effort to prevent transmission and control the virus."

Views on the theory of evolution
Penny told Kim Hill on RNZ in 2008, that any model that couldn't be tested was not of "much use", and a paper he co-authored in 1982 considers claims by Karl Popper that "Darwinism is not a testable scientific theory". The study attempts to test the theory of evolution by comparing phylogentic trees, taking a scientific position presenting a programme that theoretically can refute evolutionary trees even exist. It concludes that because it is a "falsifiable hypothesis", it does meet the criteria for scientific theories and can support the theory of evolution, while not considering the mechanics of evolution. In 1986, Penny and Michael Hendy wrote a chapter in the book The Fascination of Statistics. They reconsider the assertion by Karl Popper that the theory of evolution can not be tested as a  scientific theory because of the difficulties in making predictions about past events, and conclude that "statistics can be used to make tests about unique events that occurred in the past." This debate was to be a continuing theme in Penny's work. He participated in research 1991 that aimed to determine, without ambiguity, if evolutionary theory could meet Popper's criteria for the demarcation of science. The work finds, from comparing trees from the same taxa but from "different data sets", what the writers concludes shows that the theory of a single sequence being sufficient to reconstruct a whole history of life, remains the 'Myth of a Universal Tree." In 2003, he co-authored a paper that acknowledges proving the theory of evolution poses difficulties, but notes, "the issues surrounding the testability of evolutionary theory are solvable by better science...[seldom with]...one definitive test...[more likely with]..specific tests to lead to testable predictions"

Penny said that what has become known as the tree of life is biblical in origin and not a phrase first used by Darwin, although he did describe it as a 'useful simile'. Penny holds that instead of using the tree of life concept, Darwin referred to his theory as 'descent with modification'  which may include the idea of an evolutionary tree but is technically more about cycles resulting from "hybridisation, endosymbiotic gene transfer, lateral gene transfer, recombination, lineage sorting, the complexities of genealogical relationships...[emphasising, for example]...the continuity between populations, subspecies, and sibling species."

Associations
Penny was the president of the New Zealand Association of Scientists between 1989 and 1991.

Awards and acknowledgements
He was awarded the Marsden Medal in 2000 for outstanding service to science in New Zealand and internationally where he has extensive recognition and networks of collaborators, being acknowledged for "Associate Fellowships at Merton College, Oxford, and Darwin College Cambridge and as Past President of the Society for Molecular Biology and Evolution."

In 2004 Penny received the Rutherford Medal for contributions to theoretical biology, molecular evolution and the analysis of DNA.

Penny was made a Companion of the New Zealand Order of Merit in 2006 "for services to science". The Annual Report of the Institute of Molecular Biosciences (2007) noted that this award won by Penny recognised "those persons who in any field of endeavour, have rendered meritorious service to the Crown and nation or who have become distinguished by their eminence, talents, contributions or other merits."

He became the third New Zealander to be named a National Academy of Sciences foreign associate in 2018.

His contributions to science have been widely acknowledged by academic contemporaries. Peter Lockhart from Massey University said that Penny had made a "lifelong and lasting contribution to the study of molecular evolution...[and]...his work is characterised by great curiosity, intuition and a capacity to cross disciplines. In particular he has repeatedly demonstrated an uncanny ability to recognise innovative solutions to problems and to see proofs that mathematicians would eventually discover." Mike Steel, of the University of Canterbury, wrote in a tribute article in the New Zealand Science Review in 2009 that  "Penny's formula remains the most remarkable closed-form expression for any class of phylogenetic trees in evolutionary biology."

Further publications
 Evolution Now (2017). This book by Penny has been described as "presenting a historical view of evolution...[and]...calls for a 'true respect' for scientific knowledge." Another reviewer begins by noting Penny as a "doyen of New Zealand science, an internationally recognised, highly awarded and highly cited, theoretical and molecular biologist who has had a life-long fascination with evolution." The review concludes that the book is an "enlightening and entertaining tour through the thinking of one of New Zealand's great evolutionary scientists....[and]... lays out key steps along the path to our modern understanding of evolution, looks at some big picture stories that are emerging in the field and identifies major questions that remain."
Cooperation and selfishness both occur during molecular evolution (2014). This article by Penny challenges the notion of a 'selfish gene' in evolutionary theory and makes the case that "at the macromolecular level of genes and proteins the cooperative aspect of evolution is more obvious...[because]...thousands of proteins must function together in an integrated manner to use and to produce the many molecules necessary for a functioning cell." In his review of the article, Bill Martin from the University of Duesseldorf, Germany said that while Penny's conclusions were "not new...the essay is a worthwhile contribution to the record." Another reviewer, Anthony Poole, University of Canterbury said the manuscript was a timely update and rethink of the idea. He suggested further points for discussion include examining work done that shows "cooperativity can happen at a higher level even if there is competition between individuals at a lower level" and how compartmentalisation can avoid falling into ascribing agency.  Penny responded and agreed with expanding the discussion and noted that some of the examples given by Poole showing interractions between organisms were useful.
Our Relative Genetics (2004). Penny wrote this journal article as a discussion of research that had been done by others into whether the genomic sequence of the chimpanzee could provide information about how the  genetic constitution of people may have arisen as microevolution with a focus on the actual genes rather than gene regulation. He concludes that if there is a "genetic continuum between us and our ancestors and the great apes...[then]...these processes are genetically sufficient to fully account for human uniqueness — and that would be my candidate for the top scientific problem solved in the first decade of the new millennium."

References

Living people
1939 births
New Zealand biologists
New Zealand molecular biologists
New Zealand geneticists
Academic staff of the Massey University
Recipients of the Rutherford Medal
Foreign associates of the National Academy of Sciences
University of Canterbury alumni
Yale University alumni